The 2016 World Cup of Golf (known as the 2016 ISPS Handa World Cup of Golf for sponsorship reasons) was a golf tournament played from 24–27 November at Kingston Heath Golf Club in Melbourne, Australia. It was the 58th World Cup. Twenty-eight countries competed as two-player teams. The format was 72-hole stroke play; the first and third days were alternate shot, and the second and fourth days were four-ball play.

The tournament was won by Denmark by four shots.

Qualification
Jason Day, the individual champion of the 2013 World Cup of Golf, qualified automatically, representing Australia, and was allowed to select his partner as defined below. One player each from 27 other countries qualified based on their position in the Official World Golf Ranking on 1 August. The deadline for these players to commit was 11 August.

The 28 exempt players selected a partner from the same country, if such a player was ranked in the top 500 of the OWGR. If less than five other players from that country were ranked in the top 500, a player could choose a partner from outside the top 500. The deadline for teams to be finalized is 26 August.

Teams
The table below lists the teams in order of qualification (i.e. ranking of seeded player on 1 August 2016), together with their World Ranking at the time of the tournament.

The following players were eligible to be a seeded player but did not commit. The order is based on the World Rankings on 1 August 2016. Three countries with an eligible player did not compete: Argentina, Fiji and Paraguay. They were replaced by Chinese Taipei, India and Malaysia.

  Jason Day
  Dustin Johnson
  Jordan Spieth
  Rory McIlroy
  Henrik Stenson
  Bubba Watson
  Danny Willett
  Branden Grace
  Sergio García
  Justin Rose
  Louis Oosthuizen
  Charl Schwartzel
  Emiliano Grillo
  Martin Kaymer
  Anirban Lahiri
  Fabián Gómez
  Jamie Donaldson
  Vijay Singh
  Fabrizio Zanotti

Final leaderboard

References

External links

World Cup (men's golf)
Golf tournaments in Australia
Sports competitions in Melbourne
World Cup golf
World Cup golf
World Cup golf